Space-based economy is economic activity in outer space, including asteroid mining, space manufacturing, space trade, construction performed in space such as the building of space stations, space burial, and space advertising.

Space-based industrial efforts are presently in their infancy. Most such concepts would require a considerable long-term human presence in space and relatively low-cost access to space. The majority of proposals would also require technological or engineering developments in areas such as robotics, solar energy, and life support systems.

Some analysts have argued for creating an International Bank, to support deep space exploration.

See also
 NewSpace
 Space colonization

References